Oncocalyx quinquenervius is a parasitic plant species in the family Loranthaceae native to South Africa. It is also known as banded matchflower.

Description 
Oncocalyx quinquenervius is a hemiparasite.

Morphology 
The flowers are tubular, splitting down one side and have red to pink and white bands. Mainly flowering from June to September (in the southern hemisphere). The leaves are green, succulent and simple in shape, elliptic with margin entire. Usually 5 veined from the leaf base. It grows to a height of 50 cm to 100 cm. The fruit is a red berry about 10mm in diameter.

Taxonomy 
This species was previously placed in the genus Tieghemia.

Distribution and habitat 
Oncocalyx quinquenervius is endemic to the Eastern Cape and KwaZuluNatal in South Africa.

Ecology 
A stem parasite on trees.

Conservation 
The plant is listed as Least Concern in the SANBI Redlist.

References

Loranthaceae
Flora of South Africa